Copella metae is a species of fish in the splashing tetra family found in the upper Orinoco Basin and the upper Rio Negro basin. They grow no more than a few centimeters.

References

External links
 

Fish of Brazil
Fish of Venezuela
Taxa named by Carl H. Eigenmann
Fish described in 1914
Lebiasinidae